Olof Björner (born November 26, 1942, in Stockholm, Sweden) is a Swedish researcher who has specialized in documenting the live performances and recording sessions of American singer-songwriter Bob Dylan. In addition to operating bjorner.com, a website featuring detailed listings of Dylan's live concerts and studio recordings from 1956 to 2020, Björner has authored a 13-volume set on these subjects, called Olof's Files: A Bob Dylan Performance Guide, issued by UK publisher Hardinge Simpole.

Commenting on the quality of Björner's publications and his website, Dylan critic Michael Gray has written, "The detail is extraordinary, and the level of accuracy phenomenal."

Biography
Born in Stockholm in 1942, Björner obtained a computer science degree in 1967. He first worked as a computer consultant and later became a management consultant specializing in internet technology strategies for the health care industry. In 2003, he and his wife Agneta bought a bookstore in Filipstad, a small town in the Swedish countryside.

Olof Björner became interested in Dylan in 1963. His first work on the recording artist, Words Fill My Head, Written, Spoken, Sung by Bob Dylan was self-published in 1989.

Works

Notes

References

External links
 About Bob
 Still on the Road: Dylan tours and recording sessions

20th-century Swedish writers
20th-century male writers
Bob Dylan
Living people
1942 births
Writers about music
Writers from Stockholm
21st-century Swedish writers